Charles Louis Fontenay (March 17, 1917 – January 27, 2007) was an American journalist and science fiction writer. He wrote science fiction novels and short stories. His Nonfiction includes the biography of the prominent New Deal era politician Estes Kefauver.

Fontenay was editor of the Nashville Tennessean, among other newspapers, worked with the Associated Press and Gannett News Service. He retired to St. Petersburg, Florida, where he continued to write science fiction until shortly before his death.

He held a third-degree black belt in tae kwon do.

Science fiction novels (partial list)
Rebels of the Red Planet (1961)
The Day the Oceans Overflowed (1964)
Kipton and the Ovoid (1996)
Kipton in Wonderland (1996)
Kipton and the Tower of Time (1996)
Kipton and the Android (1997)
Target: Grant, 1862 (1999)
Modal (2000)

Short fiction (partial list) 
 Disqualified (1954)
 Escape Velocity (1954)
 Z (1956)
 Blind Alley (1956)
 Atom Drive (1956)
 The Silk and the Song (1956)
 Family Tree (1956)
 Conservation (1958)
 Service with a Smile (1958)
 Twice Upon a Time (1958)
 The Gift Bearer (1958)
 The Jupiter Weapon (1959)
 Wind (1959)

Collections
The Collected Works of Charles L. Fontenay, Vol. 1 (1996)
Here, There and Elsewhen (1998)

Non-fiction
Epistle to the Babylonians (1969)
Estes Kefauver: A Biography

References

External links 
 
 
 
 
 
 Statesmen Who Were Never President -- volume II in the Miller Center Series on Statesmen Defeated for President (includes Fontenay on Estes Kefauver)

1917 births
2007 deaths
20th-century American novelists
American male journalists
20th-century American journalists
American male novelists
American science fiction writers
American male short story writers
People from São Paulo
20th-century American short story writers
20th-century American male writers
20th-century American non-fiction writers
Brazilian emigrants to the United States